Juan Francisco Guerra Piñero (born 16 February 1987) is a Venezuelan football coach and former player who is currently the head coach of Phoenix Rising FC in the USL Championship.

Guerra was the first signing made by the Rowdies' new general manager/head coach combo of Farrukh Quraishi and Thomas Rongen. Upon signing, coach Rongen praised Guerra's ability to read the pitch, as well as his leadership skills.

Guerra was named Oakland Roots SC's new head coach on December 30, 2021.

On August 18, 2022, Oakland Roots removed Guerra from his head coaching position following allegations he was in discussions with Phoenix Rising FC, a rival club, without permission while still under contract with Oakland.

Guerra was officially announced as the new Phoenix Rising manager on August 22, 2022.

Managerial statistics

External links
Tampa Bay Rowdies official profile

Notes

References

1987 births
Living people
Footballers from Caracas
Venezuelan footballers
Association football midfielders
FIU Panthers men's soccer players
Brooklyn Knights players
Monagas S.C. players
Caracas FC players
UD Las Palmas players
Carabobo F.C. players
Asociación Civil Deportivo Lara players
Tampa Bay Rowdies players
Indy Eleven players
Venezuela international footballers
Venezuelan expatriate footballers
Expatriate soccer players in the United States
Expatriate footballers in Spain
USL League Two players
North American Soccer League players
USL Championship coaches
USL Championship players
Indy Eleven coaches
Venezuelan expatriate sportspeople in the United States
Venezuelan expatriate sportspeople in Spain
Phoenix Rising FC coaches
Oakland Roots SC coaches